The 2020–21 Kategoria e Parë was the 73rd official season of the Albanian football second-tier since its establishment. The season began on 4 November 2020 and ended on 26 May 2021. There were 18 teams competing this season, split in 2 groups, each with 9 teams. The 2 winners of each group gained promotion to the 2021-22 Kategoria Superiore, and played the division's final against each other. The runners-up of each group played a play-off match between them. The winners of the play-off played another promotion play-off match against the 8th ranked team of the 2020–21 Kategoria Superiore. Dinamo Tirana and Egnatia were promoted to the 2021–22 Kategoria Superiore. Elbasani, Flamurtari, Oriku, Partizani B and Veleçiku were relegated to the 2021–22 Kategoria e Dytë. Egnatia won their second Kategoria e Parë title on 22 May 2021 after beating Dinamo Tirana in the final match.

Changes from last season

Team changes

From Kategoria e Parë
Promoted to Kategoria Superiore:
 Apolonia
 Kastrioti

Relegated to Kategoria e Dytë:
 Devolli
 Iliria
 Shënkolli
 Shkumbini
 Tërbuni

To Kategoria e Parë
Relegated from Kategoria Superiore:
 Flamurtari
 Luftëtari

Promoted from Kategoria e Dytë:
 Partizani B
 Tomori
 Vora

Locations

Stadia by capacity and locations

Group A

Group B

First phase

Group A

Table

Results

Group B

Table

Results

Second phase

Promotion round

Group A

Table

Results

Group B

Table

Results

Relegation round

Group A

Table

Results

Group B

Table

Results

Final

Promotion play-off

Tomori qualified to the final play-off match.

Relegation play-offs

Butrinti was promoted to the Kategoria e Parë, while Oriku was relegated to the Kategoria e Dytë.

Tërbuni was promoted to the Kategoria e Parë, while Flamurtari was relegated to the Kategoria e Dytë.

Season statistics

Scoring

Top scorers

References

2020-21
2
Albania